Tumut Plains is a locality in the Snowy Valleys Council, New South Wales, Australia.

Heritage listings 
Tumut Plains has a number of heritage-listed sites, including:

 Tumut Plains Road: Junction Bridge, Tumut

References 

 
Snowy Valleys Council